Leslie Ablett (6 March 1904, Birkenhead, England  – 22 April 1952, Liverpool, England) was a British water polo player who competed in the 1928 Summer Olympics and in the 1936 Summer Olympics.

In the 1928 tournament he played three matches as goalkeeper for the British team.

Eight years later he was part of the British team which finished eighth in the 1936 tournament. He played three matches as goalkeeper.

See also
 Great Britain men's Olympic water polo team records and statistics
 List of men's Olympic water polo tournament goalkeepers

References

External links
 

1904 births
1952 deaths
Water polo goalkeepers
British male water polo players
Olympic water polo players of Great Britain
Water polo players at the 1928 Summer Olympics
Water polo players at the 1936 Summer Olympics